Warszawa. Année 5703 (English: Warsaw. Year 5703) is a 1992 French romantic drama film directed by Janusz Kijowski. It is about a couple in their 20s who flee the fall of the Warsaw Ghetto.
The film stars Lambert Wilson, Hanna Schygulla and Julie Delpy.

References

1990s French-language films
French World War II films
1992 films
1992 romantic drama films
French war drama films
Warsaw Ghetto fiction
French romantic drama films
1990s war drama films
1990s French films